The Kaghani goat breed from the valley of the Hazara district of Pakistan is used for the production of cashmere fiber and meat.

See also
Cashmere goat

References

Goat breeds
Fiber-producing goat breeds
Meat goat breeds
Goat breeds originating in Pakistan